Margaret Leischner RDI (born April 15, 1907 in Bischofswerda as Frida Margarete Leischner; died May 18, 1970 in Maplehurst, West Sussex, United Kingdom) was a British-German textile designer and educator. A former student at the Bauhaus, she was named Royal Designer for Industry (RDI) in 1969.

Germany 

Margarete Leischner was born in Bischofswerda, to butcher Felix Arthur Leischner and his wife Anna Frieda, and grew up in Dresden.

She enrolled at the Bauhaus in Dessau in the winter semester of 1927/1928 and completed the preliminary course with Josef Albers. After passing her journeyman's examination, Leischner became Gunta Stölzl's assistant in 1930, and managed the dye works. The following year she became a freelance designer at the Deutsche Werkstätten Hellerau, in Dresden. In addition, Leischner became head of the weaving department at the Textile and Fashion School of the City of Berlin (now HTW Berlin). She was a member of the Deutscher Werkbund, and joined the Reichskunstkammer after 1933 in order to continue working as a designer.

England 
In 1938, Leischner emigrated to England, where she soon called herself Margaret Leischner, and settled in the Manchester area, the center of the UK's textile industry. She worked for Team Valley Weaving Industries in Gateshead. After the outbreak of World War II, she was initially spared internment, but was later interned on the Isle of Man at Rushen Camp and Port Erin, from April 1940 to August 1942.

After her release, she continued to work for the British textile industry. She was also helped by contacts with influential people, such as Herbert Read. She maintained intensive contacts with the emigrated Bauhäusler Lucia Moholy as well as Heinz Loew and is known to have later been in communication with Walter Gropius and Joost Schmidt by letter.

Her work was included in the influential 1946 Britain Can Make It exhibition at the Victoria and Albert Museum in London, organized by the Council of Industrial Design.

Leischner designed new yarns and fabrics for a number of companies, which included testing and experimenting with new materials. In 1948, three years after the war ended, she was appointed professor at the Royal College of Art in London, where she taught the weaving class, and held the position of head of the weaving department until 1963. During this time she developed aircraft interiors for BOAC, as well as upholstery for furniture and car seats. In 1955, Leischner was active in India as a consultant, primarily supporting the establishment of hand weaving mills in Kashmir. In 1959, she designed a series of floor coverings made of sisal fibers under the Tintawn Carpets brand for the company Irish Ropes, who included Leischner's name and photograph in their adverts, brochures, and leaflets. 

Leischner was admitted as a member of the Society of Industrial Artists in 1952, and was a founding member of the Textile Group. In 1963, she ended her teaching career in London, becoming an honorary Fellow of the Royal College of Art, and continued as a member of the Textile Council's design scholarship committee.

Her student Eileen Ellis succeeded her at Irish Ropes/Tintawn Carpets in 1967, as Leischner was ill with cancer. The Royal Society of Arts honored her by inducting her as a Royal Designer for Industry (RDI) in 1969. Margaret Leischner died on May 18, 1970, in Maplehurst, West Sussex.

References 

 Burcu Dogramaci: Bauhaus-Transfer. Die Textildesignerin Margaret Leischner (1907–1970) in Dessau und im britischen Exil. In: Inge Hansen-Schaberg (Hrsg.): Frauen des Bauhauses während der NS-Zeit. Verfolgung und Exil. edition text + kritik, München 2012. ISBN 978-3-86916-212-6. pp 95–116.
 Burcu Dogramaci: Margarete Leischner. In: Elizabeth Otto, Patrick Rösler (Hrsg.): Frauen am Bauhaus. Wegweisende Künstlerinnen der Moderne. Knesebeck, München 2019. ISBN 978-3-95728-230-9. pp 108f. Published in English in 2019 as Bauhaus Women: A Global Perspective ISBN 9781912217960, 1912217961
 Margarete Leischner. In: Patrick Rössler, Elizabeth Otto: Frauen am Bauhaus. Wegweisende Künstlerinnen der Moderne. Knesebeck, München 2019. ISBN 978-3-95728-230-9. pp 108–109. Published in English in 2019 as  Bauhaus Women: A Global Perspective ISBN 9781912217960, 1912217961
 Weltge-Wortmann, (1993). Bauhaus Textiles: Women Artists and the Weaving Workshop. 1st ed. London: Thames Hudson. ISBN 9780500280348
 Marisa Vadillo, Women designers at the Bauhaus: The history of a silent revolution. Chapter 2.3, Margaret Leischner and the textile conquest of the United Kingdom, pp 74. (2022). ISBN  9798549712089

Bauhaus alumni
Academic staff of the Bauhaus
German art educators
20th-century German artists
German weavers
Textile artists
German women artists
Women textile artists
German textile artists
20th-century German women
German-British culture
British textile designers
British textile artists
20th-century textile artists
20th-century women textile artists